Vladimir Nikolayevich Kovalyov (born 2 February 1953) is a retired Soviet-Russian figure skater who competed internationally for the USSR. He is an Olympic silver medalist and two-time World champion. He trained at VSS Trud in Moscow.

Career
Kovalyov placed second behind his British rival John Curry at the 1976 Winter Olympics. However, Kovalyov's short and free programs were filled with mistakes and the audience was displeased when the results were announced that he had placed ahead of such skaters as Toller Cranston and Jan Hoffmann. Kovalyov went on to win the gold at the World Championships in 1977 and 1979, and he was also the winner of the European Championships in 1975.

While Kovalyov entered the 1980 season as a top contender for the 1980 Lake Placid Olympics title, he was clearly poorly trained, overweight and uninspired. As a result, his jumps had become too inconsistent. For example, weeks prior to the Olympics, Kovalyov had placed 3rd at the 1980 European Championships with poor short and free programs, far behind his chief rivals, Robin Cousins and Jan Hoffmann. Once in Lake Placid, skating officials and news reporters took note of the fact that Kovalyov, perhaps unmotivated and skeptical of his chances, missed most of the practice sessions. When he did show up, he was even unable to complete basic jumps. After observing his practices, an American reporter asked Kovalyov at the pre-competition press conference, "Aside from the fact that you are the best-looking male skater in the competition, do you think you have what it takes to win here?", Kovalyov burst out of the conference, never to be seen in public again as a competitor. The Soviet officials soon withdrew him from the competition after placing 5th in compulsory figures. Kovalyov retired from competitive skating, and began his career as a skating coach.

Kovalyov, along with his chief student, Kira Ivanova, were both considered high risks for defecting to the West. Kovalyov also coached Natalia Lebedeva and Maria Butyrskaya, when her first coach, Sergei Volkov, died of cancer.

Life in America
After living for 30 years in the United States, Kovalev lashed out at the country:

Results

External links

 DatabaseOlympics.com

Navigation

1953 births
Living people
Figure skaters at the 1976 Winter Olympics
Russian male single skaters
Soviet male single skaters
Olympic figure skaters of the Soviet Union
Olympic silver medalists for the Soviet Union
Olympic medalists in figure skating
World Figure Skating Championships medalists
European Figure Skating Championships medalists
Figure skaters from Moscow
Medalists at the 1976 Winter Olympics
Universiade silver medalists for the Soviet Union
Universiade medalists in figure skating
Competitors at the 1972 Winter Universiade
Anti-Americanism